Montague Island (Sugpiaq: Suklluurniilnguq) lies in the Gulf of Alaska at the entrance to Prince William Sound, Alaska.  The island has a land area of 790.88 km2 (305.36 sq mi), making it the 26th largest island in the United States.  As of the 2000 census, Montague did not have a permanent resident population, making it at that time the largest uninhabited island in the United States. Since then, the 2010 abandonment of the United States Coast Guard station on Attu Island in the Aleutian Islands, which at 892.8 km2 (344.7 sq mi) is larger than Montague Island, causes Attu to claim that title. Montague Island was named by Captain James Cook in honor of John Montagu, 4th Earl of Sandwich, one of his greatest supporters.

Montague Island is well known in Seward, Alaska, for its sports fishery, and it is referred to as "The Land of the Giants." In 2007, the waters around the island produced a 350-pound (156-kg) halibut and many boats full of fish weighing over 100 pounds (45 kg) each.

The island's coastal ecology has been subjected to "unprecedented amounts of ocean trash" transported by wind and currents from Japan's March 2011 tsunami, according to the Center for Alaskan Coastal Studies in May 2012. A large-scale clean-up began on 22 May 2012, funded by The Marine Conservation Alliance Foundation.

Popular Culture
Charles Alexander Sheldon's chapters "Montague Island" and "Hunting the Big Bear" in The Wilderness of the North West Pacific Coast Islands
W. Douglas Burden's chapter "This was Adventure" in his Look to the Wilderness.

References

External links
 Center for Alaskan Coastal Studies
 The Marine Conservation Alliance Foundation
 Gulf of Alaska Keeper

Islands of Alaska
Islands of Chugach Census Area, Alaska
Islands of Unorganized Borough, Alaska